Bochov is a town in Karlovy Vary District in the Karlovy Vary Region of the Czech Republic. It has about 1,900 inhabitants.

Administrative parts
Villages of Číhaná, Dlouhá Lomnice, Herstošice, Hlineč, Javorná, Jesínky, Kozlov, Mirotice, Německý Chloumek, Nové Kounice, Polom, Rybničná, Sovolusky, Teleč, Těšetice and Údrč are administrative parts of Bochov.

History
The first written mention of Bochov is from 1325, when it was promoted to a market town.

Owing to a majority of German speaking population, Bochov was occupied by the Nazi Germany as one of the municipalities in Sudetenland from 1938 to 1945.

Notable people
Fanny Blatny (1873–1949), politician
Karin Stoiber (born 1943), First Lady of Bavaria

References

Cities and towns in the Czech Republic
Populated places in Karlovy Vary District